Bute Rangers Football Club was a Scottish association football club based in the town of Rothesay on the Isle of Bute. The club was founded in 1880 and disbanded in 1902. The club competed in the Scottish Cup for four seasons between 1882 and 1891. The club's home colours were amber and blue shirts with navy blue shorts.

References 

Defunct football clubs in Scotland
Association football clubs established in 1880
1880 establishments in Scotland
Association football clubs disestablished in 1902
1902 disestablishments in Scotland
Isle of Bute
Football in Argyll and Bute